Waweru is a Kenyan name given to baby boys of the Kikuyu tribe in the Mount Kenya region.
Charles Waweru Kamathi (born 1978), Kenyan long-distance runner
David Waweru, CEO of WordAlive Publishers
George Japhet Waweru (born 1978), Kenyan footballer
Joel Waweru Mwangi (born 1959), Kenyan bishop
John Kiarie Waweru, Kenyan politician
Julius Waweru Karangi (born 1951), former General in the Kenya Defense Forces
Patrick Waweru (born 1958), Kenyan boxer
Peter Waweru, Kenyan football referee
Wangechi Waweru (born 1994), Kenyan musician

Surnames of Kenyan origin